Caesonius Bassus was a politician of the late Roman Empire. Probably the son of Lucius Caesonius Ovinius Manlius Rufinianus Bassus, he was consul for 317 alongside Ovinius Gallicanus. Egyptian sources state they were in office from 8 January but sources from the western Roman Empire state that they only entered office on 17 February.

References

Imperial Roman consuls
3rd-century births
4th-century deaths
Bassus